The 1960–61 Utah Redskins men's basketball team represented the University of Utah in the 1965-66 season. Head coach Jack Gardner would lead the Utes to a Mountain States Athletic Conference championship and the Final Four of the NCAA tournament. The team finished with an overall record of 23–8 (12–2 MSAC).

Roster

Schedule and results

|-
!colspan=9 style=| Regular Season

|-
!colspan=9 style=| NCAA Tournament

Rankings

Awards and honors
Billy McGill – Consensus Second-Team All-American

References

Utah Utes men's basketball seasons
Utah
Utah
NCAA Division I men's basketball tournament Final Four seasons
Utah Utes
Utah Utes